= Richey Creek =

Stream in Iowa, U.S.

Coordinates: 41.430417°N 91.393854°W

Richey Creek is a stream in the U.S. state of Iowa.

Richey Creek was named after N. B. Richey, a pioneer who settled in the area in the 1860s.
